Gregorio Montemayor Fernandez (May 25, 1904 – March 11, 1973) was a Filipino film actor and director, and father of Rudy Fernandez.

Personal life 
Fernandez was born on May 25, 1904 to Eugenio Araneta Fernandez and Maria Montemayor. He married Pilar Padilla (daughter of Jose Padilla Sr.), the couple have eight children including Rudy Fernandez.

Filmography

Director

Actor

Screenwriter

References

External links
 

Filipino film directors
Filipino screenwriters
1904 births
1973 deaths
Male actors from Pampanga
Gregorio
People from Quezon City
Burials at The Heritage Park
20th-century Filipino male actors
20th-century Filipino writers
Filipino male film actors
20th-century screenwriters